"Shōdō" is the fortieth single by B'z, released on January 25, 2006. This song is one of B'z many number-one singles in Oricon charts. The title track was used as the seventeenth opening theme of Case Closed.

Track listing 
 - 3:17
 - 4:08

Music video
 The title Shōdō shares the same pronunciation as shodo, the Japanese art of calligraphy. The music video features Japanese calligrapher Sōun Takeda writing the title in kanji.

Certifications

References 
B'z performance at Oricon

External links 
 

2006 singles
B'z songs
Case Closed songs
Oricon Weekly number-one singles
Songs written by Tak Matsumoto
Songs written by Koshi Inaba